Vauxcéré is a former commune in the department of Aisne in northern France. On 1 January 2016, it was merged into the new commune Les Septvallons.

Population

See also

Communes of the Aisne department

References

Former communes of Aisne
Aisne communes articles needing translation from French Wikipedia
Populated places disestablished in 2016